Tove-Lise Torve (born 8 June 1964, in Sunndalsøra) is a Norwegian politician for the Norwegian Labour Party. She was mayor of Sunndal municipality in Møre og Romsdal from 2007 until her election to the Stortinget in 2009. She was the Labour Party's 3rd candidate in the county, and she is also deputy leader of the Møre og Romsdal Labour Party.

She is a trained nurse.

Storting committees 
2009–2013 member of The Justice Committee

External links 
Tove-Lise Torve at Stortinget
Tove-Lise Torve at TV 2

1964 births
Living people
People from Sunndal
Members of the Storting
Labour Party (Norway) politicians
Mayors of places in Møre og Romsdal
Women mayors of places in Norway
21st-century Norwegian politicians
21st-century Norwegian women politicians
Women members of the Storting